Casa Aramara is a private, seaside estate in Punta Mita, Mexico. The property was built by media entrepreneur, Joe Francis.

Casa Aramara is in Punta Mita, a 1,500-acre beachfront village on the north end of Banderas Bay in the Mexican state of Nayarit, about 10 miles (16 km) north of Puerto Vallarta, Jalisco.

History and residence
The estate was named after Aramara, the Huichol Indian goddess of life, from the natives who lived on the land where the resort is now located. The 40,000-square-foot property was commissioned by Joe Francis and designed by Martyn-Lawrence Bullard. The home was featured on Bravo's hit television show, Million Dollar Decorators, and E!'s mega franchise, Keeping Up with the Kardashians.

The estate has been a private getaway for Jennifer Aniston, Eva Longoria, Demi Moore, and the Kardashian family. In 2013, Kourtney Kardashian and boyfriend Scott Disick took their children to Casa Aramara. In December 2012, Extra and The X Factor host Mario Lopez used the property as the site for his wedding to Courtney Mazza, which was filmed by the cable network TLC in Mario and Courtney's Wedding Fiesta. Kourtney Kardashian revisited the resort in April 2014 with her partner, Scott Disick, and their children, Mason and Penelope Disick to celebrate her 35th Birthday. Kim Kardashian and Kanye West celebrated their honeymoon in June 2014 in Casa Aramara.

External links
 Casa Aramara Official Website

References

Hotels in Mexico
Buildings and structures in Nayarit
Hotels established in 2013
2013 establishments in Mexico